Alain Bosquet, born Anatoliy Bisk (28 March 1919 – 17 March 1998), was a French poet.

Life
In 1925, his family moved to Brussels and he studied at the Université Libre de Bruxelles, then at the Sorbonne.

He fought in the Belgian army in 1940, then in the French army. In 1942, he fled with his family to Manhattan, where he helped edit the Free French magazine Voix de France. He enlisted in the U.S. Army during World War II, and received U.S. citizenship. He met his wife, Norma Caplan, in Berlin. He was  Special Adviser to the mission on behalf of the Allied Control Council Quadripartite Council of Berlin from 1945 to 1951.

In 1947, with Alexander Koval and Édouard Roditi founded the German-language literary review, Das Lot ("The Sounding Line"), six numbers from October 1947 until June, 1952, with publisher Karl Heinz Henssel in Berlin.

In 1957, Galerie Parnass (Wuppertal) published the Artist's book Micro Macro with poems by Alain Bosquet and lithographs from Heinz Trökes in 50 copies.

In 1958, he taught French literature at Brandeis University, then American literature at the University of Lyon from 1959 to 1960. He worked as a freelance critic for Combat, Le Monde, and Le Figaro.

He became a French citizen in 1980.

He headed the jury of the Max Jacob Prize, the Académie Mallarmé and was a member of the Royal Academy of Belgium.

Awards
 1968 Prix de poésie le Metais-Larivière (by the Académie française)
 1986 Prix Chateaubriand
 1989 Prix Goncourt de la poésie
 1991 Grand prix de la poésie de la ville de Paris
 1992 Prix de la langue de France
 Officer of the Legion of Honour
 Bronze Star Medal

Works

English translations

Poetry
 Les mois de l'année
 La vie est clandestine 1945
 A la mémoire de ma planète 1948
 Langue morte 1951
 Quel royaume oublié 1955
 have a nice day and forget you
 Deuxième testament 1959, Prix Max Jacob
 Maître objet 1962
 Quatre testaments et autres poèmes 1967
 100 notes pour une solitude 1969
 Notes pour un amour 1972
 Penser contre soi 1973
 Notes pour un pluriel 1974
 Livre du doute et de la grâce 1977
 Vingt et une nature morte ou mourantes 1978
 Poème un 1979
 Les enfants 1980
 Raconte-moi le passé... 1980
 Sonnets pour une fin de siècle 1981
 Poème deux 1981
 Un jour après la vie 1984
 L'autre origine 1984
 Le tournament de Dieu 1987, Prix Chateaubriand
 Bourreaux et acrobates, poèmes sans chauffeur 1990
 Le gardien des rosées 1991
 Effacez moi ce visage 1991
 Capitaine de l'absurde 1991
 Demain sans moi 1994
 La fable et le fouet 1995
 Mer
 Les mots sont des êtres
 La trompe de l'éléphant
 Un enfant m'a dit...
 Arbre

Essays
 Saint-John Perse
 Pierre Emmanuel
 Walt Whitman
 Emily Dickinson
 Robert Sabatier
 Lawrence Durrell
 Conrad Aiken
 Carl Sandburg
 Anthologie de la poésie américaine 1956
 35 jeunes poètes américains 1961
 Verbe et vertige 1962
 Les 20 Meilleurs Nouvelles Françaises (1964) Ed. Gérard et C°, Coll. " Bibliothèque Marabout Géant " n° 192.
 Les 20 Meilleurs Nouvelles Russes (1964) Ed. Gérard et C°, Coll. " Bibliothèque Marabout Géant " n° 202.
 Middle West 1967
 Un atlas des voyages 1967
 Injustice 1969
 Les Poèmes de l'année, Alain Bosquet, Pierre Seghers, eds, Seghers., 1968
 Roger Caillois 1971
 En compagnie de Marcel Arland 1973
 Pas d'accord Soljénitsyne 1974
 La poésie française depuis 1950, une anthologie 1979
 La poésie francophone de Belgique 1987
 La mémoire ou l'oubli 1990
 Marlène Dietrich, une amour par téléphone 1992
 La Russie en lambeaux 1991
 Van Vogh 1980

Novels
 La Grande Éclipse 1952
 Ni singe ni Dieu 1953
 Le mécréant 1960
 Un besoin de malheur 1963
 La Confession mexicaine 1965
 Les tigres de papier 1968
 L'amour à deux têtes 1970
 Chicago, oignon sauvage 1971
 Monsieur Vaudeville 1973
 L'amour bourgeois 1974
 Les bonnes intentions 1975
 Une mère russe 1978
 Jean-louis Trabart, médecin 1980
 L'enfant que tu étais 1982
 Ni guerre, ni paix 1983
 Les Petites éternités 1984 → 1964
 Les fêtes cruelles 1984
 Lettre à mon père qui aurait eu 100 ans 1987
 Claudette comme tout le monde 1991
 Les solitudes 1992

Stories
 Georges et Arnold, Arnold et Georges 1995
 Marlène Dietrich, Un amour par téléphone, Paris, La Différence, 1992, rééd. coll. "Minos", 2002.

Non-fiction
 Un homme pour un autre 1985
 Le métier d'otage 1989
 Comme un refus de la planète 1989

Theatre
 Un détenu à Auschwitz 1991
 Kafka-Auschwitz 1993

References

1919 births
1998 deaths
20th-century French poets
United States Army personnel of World War II
French military personnel of World War II
Belgian military personnel of World War II
Soviet emigrants to Belgium
Belgian emigrants to the United States
American expatriates in Germany
Winners of the Prix Broquette-Gonin (literature)
Prix Goncourt de la Poésie winners
Prix Interallié winners
Prix Sainte-Beuve winners
Prix Guillaume Apollinaire winners
Officiers of the Légion d'honneur
University of Paris alumni
French male poets
Members of the Académie royale de langue et de littérature françaises de Belgique
20th-century French male writers
United States Army soldiers
French Army personnel
Belgian Army personnel
Free University of Brussels (1834–1969) alumni
American emigrants to France